Federico Rocchetti (born 14 January 1986) is an Italian racing cyclist. He rode at the 2013 UCI Road World Championships.

Major results

2009
 6th GP Citta di Felino
 7th Cronoscalata Gardone Val Trompia — Prati di Caregno
 9th Trofeo Edil C
2010
 3rd Trofeo Città di Brescia
2011
 5th GP Nobili Rubinetterie
 5th GP Industria & Artigianato
2012
 10th Overall Giro della Provincia di Reggio Calabria
2013
 1st Giro del Medio Brenta
 3rd Central European Tour Miskolc GP
 5th Giro dell'Appennino
 9th Giro della Toscana

References

External links
 

1986 births
Living people
Italian male cyclists
Place of birth missing (living people)
Cyclists from Bergamo